Hellenic State Railways or SEK (Sidirodromi Ellinikou Kratous; Σ.Ε.Κ.) was a Greek public sector entity (legal person of public law) which was established in 1920 and operated most Greek railway lines until 1970.

History
The Hellenic State Railways took over the standard gauge railway line from Piraeus to Papapouli at the pre-1912 borders, the extension from Papapouli to Platy and most of the former Ottoman railway lines that were within the Greek borders after 1919. These lines were:

 Piraeus, Demerli & Frontiers Railway, also known as 
 Part of the former Thessaloniki & Monastir Railway ( or SM) 
The line from Alexandroupolis to Ormenio was transferred to the French-Hellenic Railway Company (CFFH) of Evros ( or ) which was absorbed by SEK much later, in 1954
 The Thessaloniki-Constantinople Link Railway ( or JSC) operating the Thessaloniki–Alexandroupolis railway.

 The 66 km long Sarakli-Stavros line, a former military line ( gauge) constructed during World War I (see also: Perivolaki – Nea Zichni railway line).
 The 50 km long Skydra local railway, a former military line ( gauge) constructed during World War I and initially operated until 1936 by a company called Local Railways of Macedonia.

After World War II the Hellenic State Railways absorbed most other Greek railways, including:

 Piraeus, Athens and Peloponnese Railways (1962), which had already absorbed other minor metre gauge railways.
 Thessaly Railways (1955), including Pelion railway. 
 The French-Hellenic Railway Company (Chemin de fer Franco-Hellenique) of Evros (1954).

Only Ellinikoi Ilektrikoi Sidirodromoi (E.I.S., later Athens-Piraeus Electric Railways), operator of Piraeus-Kifissia railway and Piraeus-Perama light railway, and the private mining and industrial lines remained independent.

The Hellenic State Railways existed until December 31, 1970. On the next day all railways in Greece with the exception of private industrial lines and E.I.S. were transferred to Hellenic Railways Organisation S.A., a state-owned corporation.

Network and other infrastructure

During this period very little expansion of the existing network took place, the most notable being:

 The Amyntaio-Kozani branch (1955).
 Another 25 km long branch line from Nea Zichni (Mirini) to Amphipolis (1931), which was later abandoned and the track was lifted in 1970.
 Conversion of the line between Athens and Inoi to double track.

A contract was signed in 1928 for a new line connecting Kalampaka to Kozani, but the project was abandoned in 1932 due to lack of funds.

The Greek railway system (both infrastructure and rolling stock) suffered serious damages during World War II (especially in 1943–1944) and did not become fully operational until 1950. However the viaduct of Achladokampos in Peloponnese, destroyed in 1944, was rebuilt only in 1974.

In 1960 the line from Larissa to Volos, of the former Thessaly Railways, was converted to standard gauge and was connected in Larissa with the line from Athens to Thessaloniki.

New station buildings were constructed in Thessaloniki (known as Thessaloniki New Passenger Station or ΝΕΣΘ) (1952), Larissa (1962), Lianokladi (1950), Sindos, Aiginio, Platamon, Florina, Edessa, Agras, Arnissa, Polykastron, Ptolemais and Kozani.

Rolling stock
Until 1962 the Hellenic State Railways used a variety of steam locomotives from various sources. Some of them belonged to the pre-1920 networks, a number were acquired as part of foreign aid programs after the war and a small number was procured.

Conversion to diesel traction began in the early 1960s. The first diesel locomotives were delivered in 1962 and included 30 Krupp Y60 shunters (Class A-101), 10 ALCo DL532B (Class A-201) and 10 ALCo DL500C (Class A-301). They were followed by classes A-221, A-321, A-351, A-401 and A-411 for the  network and classes A-9101, A-9201 and A-9401 for the  networks.

Diesel multiple units were first introduced in 1936 and became more common in the 1950s and 1960s. Steam locomotives were slowly phased out but were still in limited use in December 1970.

Steam locomotives

The following table shows steam locomotives acquired by the Hellenic State Railways between 1920 and 1969. They also continued to use an assortment of older types of locomotives inherited from the previous Greek and Ottoman railway companies.

Diesel locomotives (standard gauge)

Diesel locomotives (metre gauge)

Diesel multiple units

The Hellenic State Railways bought their first DMUs in 1936 and acquired larger numbers in the 1950s. Additional metre gauge multiple units were inherited from networks absorbed in SEK.

See also
 Railways of Greece
 Hellenic Railways Organisation

References and notes

 
 
  It is the only extensive and authoritative source for the history of Greek railways.

Further reading
  Contains brief history, simple line maps and extensive list of rolling stock until 1997.
 
 
 
 

Defunct railway companies of Greece
Government-owned companies of Greece
Railway companies established in 1920
Railway companies disestablished in 1970
1970 disestablishments in Greece
Greek companies established in 1920